Lowari Tunnel (Lowari Surang) is a  vehicular tunnel under the Lowari Pass of the Hindu Kush mountains, between Dir and Chitral in Khyber Pakhtunkhwa province of Pakistan. It is operated by the National Highway Authority and carries traffic on the N-45 National Highway, thus bypassing Lowari Pass. Construction was partly completed by June 2017, By late 2018, the tunnel was open to vehicular traffic for at least ten hours per day.

The tunnel is one of the longest tunnels in South Asia, and is the longest in Pakistan, superseding the  Khojak Tunnel in 2018.

History
Originally conceived as a railway tunnel, construction began in September 1975 and was inaugurated by Prime Minister Zulfiqar Ali Bhutto. However, less than a year later work stopped in 1976 due to non allocation of funds.

Construction resumed in September 2005, and the tunnel was initially expected to be completed by 2009; with conversion into a vehicle road tunnel. This is one of the mega highway projects initiated in 2005 during the government of Pervez Musharraf. But work was stopped at times due to a shortage of funds, and at others due to a change in design and security reasons.

Work on the new plan started in 2013 when the Prime Minister Nawaz Sharif came to power. He ordered the release of funds and the project was completed in a short time.

Benefit
The tunnel essentially allows traffic on the N45 National Highway to bypass the Lowari Pass and was intended to reduce the 14 hour drive between Chitral and Peshawar to only 7 hours. The tunnel also facilitates all-weather transportation, as during the long winter season the Lowari Pass is closed, and travelers to and from Chitral used to have to travel into Afghanistan and then back into Pakistan to access the rest of the country. The tunnel is facilitating economic development in the Chitral district, as of late 2018.

References

https://www.chitraltoday.net/2020/02/09/lowari-tunnel-a-blessing-for-chitral/

https://www.chitraltoday.net/2017/06/lowari-tunnel-ready-for-opening-at-last/

https://www.chitraltoday.net/2015/01/pm-orders-yearly-increase-of-rs-6-billion-for-lowari-tunnel/

External links
http://chitraltoday.net/work-on-tunnel-gains-momentum/
Lowari tunnel work in full swing
Ice melts on the Lowari tunnel
National Highways Authority: Development Projects

Tunnels in Pakistan
Chitral District
Upper Dir District
Road tunnels in Pakistan
Tunnels completed in 2017